Aspidistra is a plant genus (from the Greek aspidion, a small round shield).

Aspidistra may also refer to:

 Aspidistra elatior, an Aspidistra species used as a houseplant
 Aspidistra (transmitter), a radio transmitter codenamed Aspidistra and used by Britain in the Second World War to beam propaganda to Germany
 An Aspidistra in Babylon, novel by H. E. Bates
 Keep the Aspidistra Flying, novel by George Orwell
 "The Biggest Aspidistra in the World", 1938 song by Gracie Fields